Nowhere Fast may refer to:
"Nowhere Fast" (Eminem song)
"Nowhere Fast" (Fire Inc. song)
"Nowhere Fast", a song by Blackalicious from Blazing Arrow
"Nowhere Fast", a song by EarthGang from Rags
"Nowhere Fast", a song by Incubus from Make Yourself
"Nowhere Fast", a song by Old Dominion from Meat and Candy
"Nowhere Fast", a song by Pennywise from Full Circle
"Nowhere Fast", a song by Proof from I Miss the Hip Hop Shop
"Nowhere Fast", a song by The Smiths from Meat Is Murder